Manchester, Blackley  was a borough constituency represented in the House of Commons of the Parliament of the United Kingdom.   It elected one Member of Parliament (MP) by the first past the post system of election. In boundary changes for the 2010 general election it was replaced by Blackley and Broughton.

Boundaries 

1918–1974: The County Borough of Manchester wards of Blackley, Crumpsall, and Moston.

1974–1983: The County Borough of Manchester wards of Blackley, Charlestown, Crumpsall, Lightbowne, and Moston.

1983–2010: The City of Manchester wards of Blackley, Charlestown, Crumpsall, Harpurhey, Lightbowne, and Moston.

This constituency was one of Labour's safest seats, though prior to 1964 it was regarded as a reasonably safe Conservative seat, with the party only gaining the seat once, in their 1945 landslide victory. Located in the North of the city, it included the overspill area of Blackley, the deprived inner-city area of Harpurhey, and the districts of Moston, Crumpsall and Charlestown.

Boundary review
From 2010 this seat was abolished, and its constituents form one part of the Blackley and Broughton seat with two electoral wards from Salford.

Members of Parliament

Elections

Elections in the 2000s

Elections in the 1990s

Elections in the 1980s

Elections in the 1970s

Elections in the 1960s

Elections in the 1950s

Elections in the 1940s

Elections in the 1930s

Elections in the 1920s

Elections in the 1910s 

No candidate who was endorsed by the Coalition Government.

See also 
 List of parliamentary constituencies in Greater Manchester

Notes and references
Craig, F. W. S. (1983). British parliamentary election results 1918-1949 (3 ed.). Chichester: Parliamentary Research Services. .

Sources
 Pre-1945 MPs taken from https://web.archive.org/web/20060520143047/http://www.manchester.gov.uk/elections/archive/gen1945.htm

Constituencies of the Parliament of the United Kingdom established in 1918
Constituencies of the Parliament of the United Kingdom disestablished in 2010
Parliamentary constituencies in Manchester (historic)